KSKA (91.1 FM) is a non-commercial radio station in Anchorage, Alaska, United States.  The station airs public radio programming from the National Public Radio network and the BBC World Service.  KSKA also airs some locally originated programming.

Translators
KSKA makes use of broadcast translators to increase the coverage of the main station on 91.1 MHz.

References

External links
 KSKA official website
 Radio Coqui program website
 

1978 establishments in Alaska
SKA
KSKA (FM)
Radio stations established in 1978
SKA